Douglas William Roberts (born October 28, 1942) is an American retired professional ice hockey player and coach who played 419 games in the National Hockey League and 140 games in the World Hockey Association between 1966 and 1977.

Career 
Roberts played for the California Golden Seals, Boston Bruins, Detroit Red Wings, and New England Whalers after starring for the Michigan State University hockey team. His NHL career was comparatively modest, but he did participate in the 1971 NHL All-Star Game as the weak Seals lone representative at a time when there were very few American players in the NHL. 

After retiring from hockey, he served as the head coach of the Connecticut College men's ice hockey team in 1980–2000. He is the brother of Gordie Roberts and father of David Roberts, both former NHL players.

Awards and honors

Played in NHL All-Star Game (1971)

Career statistics

External links 

1942 births
Living people
American expatriate ice hockey players in Finland
American men's ice hockey right wingers
Boston Braves (AHL) players
Boston Bruins players
California Golden Seals players
Detroit Red Wings players
Fort Worth Wings players
Ice hockey people from Detroit
Jokerit players
Memphis Wings players
National Hockey League All-Stars
New England Whalers players
Oakland Seals players
Rhode Island Reds players
Virginia Wings players
AHCA Division I men's ice hockey All-Americans